Samuel Ross (born 1991) is a British product and fashion designer, creative director and artist. He is known for founding the fashion label A-COLD-WALL* and working with brands such as Hublot, Off-White, Oakley, Nike and Barney's.

Early life and education 
Ross was born in the Brixton neighbourhood of London, United Kingdom to second generation Windrush parents of Caribbean descent. Shortly after his birth he moved to Northamptonshire, United Kingdom. He attended and graduated from de Montfort University, Leicester where he received first class honours for a Bachelor of Arts in Graphic Design and Illustration and was awarded the FSG design award in 2012.

Career 
After graduating from university, Ross worked as a graphic product designer for Wilkinson and Beko. He went on to intern for and subsequently work with luxury streetwear label Off-White after reaching out to the label's founder Virgil Abloh, who became Ross's mentor. During his time working for Abloh, Ross also designed for Kanye West's creative content company Donda.

He founded the fashion label A-COLD-WALL* in 2015. Through A-COLD-WALL*, Ross has collaborated with Nike, Converse, Dr Martens, Timberland, Mackintosh, Aqua di Parma, Kohler, and Diesel’s Red Tag.

As of 2020, Ross is a brand ambassador for Hublot. “This relationship from the very beginning with Hublot was about redefining how designers and artists and creative directors work with the luxury sector beyond the traditional collaboration model,” said Ross in an interview with HYPEBEAST. He featured prominently in Apple's Behind the Mac campaign.

Ross launched SR_A (Samuel Ross & Associates) at the Hublot Prize exhibition in the Serpentine Gallery in 2019. SR_A is a studio operating within the fields of luxury industrial design, interior installation, architecture, furniture design, sound design and sculptural/visual communication.

In 2023, his work was included in the exhibition Mirror Mirror: Reflections on Design at Chatsworth at Chatsworth House.

Awards and honours 
Ross is the recipient of the 2018 British Fashion Award for Emerging Menswear Designer, the 2019 Hublot Design Prize, Forbes 30 under 30 Europe, the 2020 GQ USA Fashion Award and the 2020 People of the Year British Fashion Award for his philanthropic endeavours. He received an honorary doctorate from The University of Westminster in 2021. Ross is a recipient of a 2021 British Fashion Award, within the category 'Leaders of Change'.

References

External links 
 

British fashion designers
Creative directors
1991 births
Living people